R561 road may refer to:
 R561 road (Ireland)
 R561 road (South Africa)